Automeris patagoniensis, the Patagonia eyed silkmoth, is a species of insect in the family Saturniidae. It is found in North America.

The MONA or Hodges number for Automeris patagoniensis is 7749.2.

References

Further reading

 
 
 

Hemileucinae
Articles created by Qbugbot
Moths described in 1992